Frank George Horsfall (19 September 1924 – 28 August 1992) was an Australian-born footballer.

Horsfall played for Southend United and Southampton in the Football League.

After retiring from football Horsfall worked for many years with Southampton as a coach.

References

1924 births
1992 deaths
Australian soccer players
Soccer players from Perth, Western Australia
Association football midfielders
English Football League players
Southern Football League players
Guildford City F.C. players
Southampton F.C. players
Southend United F.C. players
Australian expatriate soccer players
Australian expatriate sportspeople in England
Expatriate footballers in England